Vincent Droesbeke (born 25 September 1991) is a French male professional squash player. He achieved his highest career ranking of 129 on May, 2017 during the 2017 PSA World Tour and is currently ranked 172nd during the 2018 PSA World Tour.

References 

1991 births
Living people
French male squash players
Sportspeople from Bourges
Sportspeople from Cher (department)
21st-century French people